This is a list of barley-based drinks. Barley, a member of the grass family was one of the first domesticated grains in the Fertile Crescent and drinks made from it range from thin herbal teas and beers to thicker drinkable puddings and gruels.

Barley has been used as a source of fermentable material for beer for thousands of years and whiskey for hundreds of years. Barley beer was probably one of the first alcoholic drinks developed by Neolithic humans. More recently it has been used as a component of various health foods and drinks.

In 2016, barley was ranked fourth among grains in quantity produced (141 million tonnes) behind maize, rice and wheat.

Barley-based drinks

Traditional drinks
 Barley milk 
 Barley water 
 Barley wine 
 Beer 
 Café de cebada
 Caffè d'orzo (Coffee of Barley) 
 Emoliente
 Malt drink 
 Malt liquor 
 Malt whisky 
 Malta (soft drink) 
 Malted milk 
 Pinol 
 Roasted barley tea 
 Talbina

Commercial products
 Amul Pro
 Barleycup 
 Canvas Barley Milk
 Caro
 Horlicks 
 Inka
 Ovaltine 
 RoBarr roasted barley
 Robinsons barley water 
 Supermalt

See also
 Coffee substitute
 Malt 
 Mash ingredients 
 Roasted grain drink

References

External links
 

Lists of drinks